Hippocalcin is a protein that in humans is encoded by the HPCA gene.

Hippocalcin is a calcium-binding protein that belongs to the neuronal calcium sensor (NCS) family of proteins. It is expressed in mammalian brains especially in the hippocampus. It possesses a Ca2+/myristoyl switch.

Processes 

Hippocalcin takes part in the following processes:

 Activation of PLD1 and PLD2 expression
 Inhibition of apoptosis
 MAP kinase signalling
 Involved in long term depression in hippocampal neuron
 Required for normal spatial learning

Interactions 

Hippocalcin interacts with following proteins:

 Neuronal apoptosis inhibitory protein (NAIP)
 Mixed lineage kinase 2 (MLK2) – MLK2 is myosin light chain kinase 2
 The b2 adaptin of the AP2 complex
 Calcium-dependent activator protein for secretion (CADPS)

References

Further reading

External links 
NCS proteins

EF-hand-containing proteins
Hippocampus (brain)